Paurashpur is an Indian Hindi-language fictional historical period original web series which was streamed on ALTBalaji and ZEE5. The web series is conceptualised by Baljit Singh Chaddha,  directed by Sachindra Vats and produced by Sachin Mohite under the production company named as Jaasvand Entertainment. It stars Annu Kapoor, Milind Soman, Shilpa Shinde and Shaheer Sheikh. The series was released on 29 December 2020. The series received a mostly mixed critical reception, with reviewers criticising the show's writing and overuse of sexual content.

Cast 

 Annu Kapoor as Bhadrapratap Singh
 Milind Soman as Boris (role of a transgender person)
 Shilpa Shinde as Queen Meerawati
 Shaheer Sheikh as Veer Singh
 Flora Saini as Nayantara
Aditya Lal as Prince Ranveer
 Anant Joshi as Prince Aditya
 Sahil Salathia as Bhanu
 Poulomi Das as Kala
 Kashish Rai as Kusumlata
 Ashmita Bakshi as Umanglata

Episodes list

Release and marketing 
On 15 October 2020, ALTBalaji announced about the web series and it has released on 29 December 2020. The web series logo was launched on 2 December 2020 on ALTBalaji's official Instagram profile with 16 different Indian languages. Teaser was launched on 6 December 2020.

Critical Reception 

Archika Khurana of The Times of India has given 2/5 stars stating that the plot unfolds to draw out the state of women in society and addresses some significant issues like patriarchy, gender politics and power. However, it ends up being a tedious watch due to its weak endeavour. Directed by Shachindra Vats, this seven-part series bought together many ingredients—good setup, great casting, and strong background score— but the final dish turns out to be not-so-inviting.

Anvita Singh of The Indian Express criticise that "The script is abysmal, and the dialogues are just plain bad. It is a groundbreaking epic drama about lust, revenge and patriarchy. However, it comes across as soft porn. There are unnecessary sex scenes, which, by the way, have not been shot aesthetically."

Gautam Batra of Koimoi has given 1/5 star to this web series stating that "The makers have tried to titillate their viewers with erotic scenes but they are forgettable. A concept like this needed labour of love from the writers because the story has a huge scope and is promising. There are several elements of the storyline which need to reach the audience. There are too many loose ends and so much half-hearted work."

123telugu has criticised the web series with 2.25/5 stars. They says that the web series is a high budget erotic drama that fails to entertain. Even though the story, premise, and performances by the lead cast are good, the horrible narration, logic, and sleaze content make this series a boring, over the top and bland watch this weekend.

Dyuti Gupta or SheThePeople.TV criticised that "This Ekta Kapoor Series Is Just Glitter, No Gold". The plot had ample potential to turn out to be a Bahubali-sized blockbuster, but a below-average script added with an equally poor direction makes it something you’d be better off skipping. There are so many loopholes and loose ends that the entire show feels like a half-hearted effort on part of the makers. The CGI and VFX are lousy, the screenplay is preposterous and the dialogues are downright cringeworthy.

Binged criticised this web series with 2/10 stars saying that it is a terrible series and an utterly forgettable affair. There nothing more to say. The music, in combination with the poor acting, gives the series an unintentional hilarious feeling. The background score generously uses the ‘Uttama villain’ classic themes. The editing could have been far better, more so since it’s by the director. The whole thing looks so rushed.  The writing is unintentionally hilarious in parts.

Ravi Bule of ABP News Live criticise that the web series with Gender Discrimination Raises Cheaply Series and rather focuses on Kama Sutra like content.

TV9 Hindi criticise that Story has been focused on bold scenes, no character could leave impression.

References

External links 
 Paurashpur on ALTBalaji
Paurashpur on ZEE5
 

ALTBalaji original programming
Period pieces
Hindi-language television shows
Indian LGBT-related web series